Ang Lihim ni Antonio is a 2008 Philippines film by Filipino film director Joselito Altarejos. It tells the story about teenage boy whose emerging gay sexuality alienates him from his friends and family, until his libertine uncle, Jonbert (Josh Ivan Morales), comes to live with him and his mother. Antonio thinks he has found a kindred spirit, until the older man's intentions toward the boy become incestuous and an act of unthinkable violence leaves the family reeling.

Plot
Antonio (Kenji Garcia) is a sexually curious fifteen-year-old boy who is beginning to discover his own sexuality. Although his straight best friend, Mike (Jiro Manio), has been supportive of his coming out, his first sexual encounter with another man has led to the destruction of his friendship with his other best friend, Nathan (Ferdinand Zandro Salonga) with whom he had engaged in sexual intercourse on one drunken Christmas night.

Antonio's exploration of his identity unfolds as his family begins to break apart. His altruistic mother, Tere (Shamaine Centenera-Buencamino) is in complete denial that his father has already abandoned them.

One day, Antonio's grandparents arrived at their home bringing in with them, his uncle Jonbert (Josh Ivan Morales). Jonbert plans to stay at Antonio's house while he is processing the necessary papers for his new work. During lunch, Antonio is seen looking at his uncle with sexual malice, and his Uncle Jonbert seems to respond, also looking with confusion.

Antonio then begins to share his room with his uncle Jonbert. And starts to have fantasies and using his uncle's belonging whenever he masturbates, he also peeked in a hole while his uncle is taking a bath, intensifying his sexual desires over his uncle. Then one rainy night, he begins to fondle his uncle while the latter is seemingly sleeping. The next night, Jonbert tells Antonio that he was aware of what Antonio did, and confessed that he enjoyed it. He further seduces Antonio, and leading the latter to perform fellatio on him.

From then on, they regularly masturbate each other and have oral sex, and sometimes sharing sweet gestures when they are alone. One morning, when the two are left in the house alone, Antonio seduced his uncle so he could give him a fellatio. Jonbert growing increasingly bored of their usual routine, suggested to anally penetrate Antonio, to which the boy refused. Unable to take no for an answer, Jonbert forces his way to Antonio while the latter objects and cries in pain.

His mother arrives, witnessed the situation and kills Jonbert.

Cast

Soundtrack
Music of the film is performed by Ajit Hardasani entitled "Awit Para Kay Antonio" (Song for Antonio). Lyrics by Lex Bonife and music by Ajit Hardasani.

Location
It was shot entirely in Marikina.

References

External links
 

2008 films
Philippine LGBT-related films
LGBT-related drama films
2008 LGBT-related films
Gay-related films